Jaana Hämäläinen (after marriage also known as Jaana Laurikka) is a Finnish curler.

At the national level, she is a three-time Finnish women's champion curler (1999, 2000, 2001), two-time Finnish mixed doubles champion curler (2009, 2012), three-time Finnish mixed champion curler (2008, 2009, 2011).

Teams

Women's

Mixed

Mixed doubles

Personal life
She started curling in 1990.

References

External links

Living people
Finnish female curlers
Finnish curling champions
Finnish curling coaches
Year of birth missing (living people)
Place of birth missing (living people)